Museum of Photography may refer to:

 Ara Güler Museum, Istanbul, Turkey
 Museum of Photography, Berlin
 Museum of Photography, Thessaloniki
 Museum of Photography, Seoul